Reichsjustizamt (English: "Office for National Justice") was the highest authority of the law in the German Empire, and was the predecessor of Reichsministerium der Justiz, the Reich Ministry of Justice.

Reichsjustizamt was under the jurisdiction of the Reichskanzler or Imperial Chancellor as Department IV from 1875 until 1 January 1877 when it became independent. Under Reichsjustizamt were the Imperial Court, the Imperial Bar, and the Imperial Patent Office. An Undersecretary of State managed the Reichsjustizamt. It continued becoming the Reichsministerium der Justiz in 1919.

References
Kenneth F. Ledford. From General Estate to Special Interest: German Lawyers 1878-1933. Cambridge University Press, Nov 2, 2006 pg. 75
Hans Schulte-Nölke. Das Reichsjustizamt und die Entstehung des Bürgerlichen Gesetzbuchs (IUS COMMUNE, Veröffentlichungen des Max-Planck-Instituts für Europäische Rechtsgeschichte, Vol. 71), Klostermann, Frankfurt/Main 1995, XIX, 378 pp

Politics of the German Empire